Her Heart for a Compass is a 2021 romance novel by Sarah Ferguson, Duchess of York. The novel is a semi-fictional story about the Duchess's great-great-aunt, Lady Margaret Montagu Douglas Scott.

Plot 

"Heavens, do you not regret anything you've done?" asks the Duchess. It's a spring afternoon in England, and perched in a corner of Royal Lodge, the sprawling cottage orné built in 1662 that was once inhabited by King George IV.

Margaret's hair is frequently featured, it's variously a "rebellious red mop", a "sodden mass of rebellious curls", a "scarlet flag, wild curls whipping around her face", and "burnished autumn leaves".

Drawing on many parallels from the authors life for the historical tale, Lady Margaret Montagu Douglas Scott was pictured in a Victorian-style floor-length outfit, complete with high-necked blouse, jacket and gloves, sitting on a stone bench gazing at a compass she held out in front of her, the Lady – although her family, the Duke and Duchess of Buccleuch, were close friends with the Queen and the Prince Consort, the Duke's ex-wife and the Queen's former in-law – struggled to come to terms with the rigorous disciplines of royal life after marrying, and that their second daughter, Margaret, was a redhead with a birthday "within a few days" of her own.

The real details of Margaret's own life are scant; described in gossip rags as a "Titian-haired breath of fresh Scotch air", was "15 years in the making". Beginning when she discovered romance, her heroine's 'rebellious' red hair is much more of a feature, that depicts her as a woman who is initially the toast of London in the Duchess' historical novel, than sex. The Fleet Street papers initially loved her raunchy edge but eventually decided it was more vulgar than charming. "It was always that I was portrayed as the sinner," she says.

When one act of rebellion costs Lady Margaret Montagu Douglas Scott her place in society, her life is swept onto a new course. One that will test her courage and resilience

She speaks with a sense of detachment about the reckless of yore, whose last major publicity push, just over a decade ago, came after the admittedly profligate royal was caught promising a reporter disguised as a sheik access to the Prince in exchange for £500 told her, "I think you probably are the woman in the world who has had more bad front pages than any other," which is saying something, she still has to have her hair done to talk to you, but she's now not so vocal.

The Lady, who has previously written her roman à clef memoirs, holding passion for historical strong women. While initially submitting to the strictures of high society and the tribulations of the marriage market, she endures a pasting from the press before emerging triumphant, throwing off the weight of expectations to become her true self. Proud to bring her personal brand to the world, sweeps the reader from the drawing rooms of Victoria's court and the grand country houses of Scotland and Ireland, where she was cast out from the royals amid her scandal, and fell deeply into debt to the slums of London, and then the mercantile bustle of 1870s New York.

Margaret embarks on a journey of self-discovery where she will meet like-minded, and equally spirited, companions who shape her world.

She once confessed: "I was hopeless from the start… they could never make me the perfect princess", it follows the Lady Margaret Montagu Douglas Scott, "who desires to break the mould, follow her internal compass – her heart – and discover her raison d'être – falling in love along the way". She is a spirited, Titian-haired, freckled beauty, whose curls just won't quit. But as she navigates the challenges of forging her own path in life, will she find the greatest courage of all, to follow her heart against all odds…?

That "I have thrown my voice into each line and I'm very proud", while it was said that "right from the start it was clear she wasn't going to be sitting in the back seat on this… She had a clear vision for what the story was that she wanted to tell, and she wanted to be involved in every stage of the process."

The novel veers around somewhat in tone, from archaic – Margaret's priest informs her that "you cannot have imagined I would have kissed you in such a manner unless my intentions were honourable" and one admirer opines: "She was very naive but, by heavens, she had real spirit, too, no one could doubt that."

The lack of sex, is "in deference to historical sexual mores", a reason that doesn't usually stop promising this will change in her second novel. "I decided I would remove bodice-ripping from this book, number one. But I'm now on book number two with Marguerite … and I have got a real bodice-ripping coming for you, just a walk in the park," however, the duchess – spirited, Titian-haired, unconventional – is just "teasing".

Well-researched, and a glimpse into the strictures of life as a pampered, rich, upper-class woman. It wears its research lightly, with intriguing forays into topics such as Victorian bathing dresses, and the Queen's predilection to "pour her tea from one cup to another until it was adequately cooled". Margaret realising that she doesn't need to "conform to the rules set down by society", that a Buccleuch woman doesn't need a strategic marriage, and that her despairing cry, "no one seems to care that underneath I'm an actual person", isn't altogether true.

She's notably svelte, smartly turned out, her red hair freshly styled — perhaps a reaction to the decades of scrutiny she has experienced as a British tabloid fixture.

Characters 

 Lady Margaret Montagu Douglas Scott
 Donald Cameron of Lochiel
 Rufus Ponsonby, Earl of Killin
 Sebastian Beckwith
 Princess Louise
 Julia Wingfield, Viscountess Powerscourt
 Mervyn Wingfield, Viscount Powerscourt 
 Walter, Duke of Buccleuch
 Charlotte, Duchess of Buccleuch
 Queen Victoria
 Aunt Marion 
 Patrick Valentine
 Mrs William Astor
 Fraser Scott
 Susannah Elmhirst

Production 
The publishing rights were acquired by Mills & Boon. The book is published by William Morrow and Company in the United States. Ferguson worked with Scottish romance author Marguerite Kaye on the novel.

Reception 
The novel placed 10th in the United Kingdom's hardback fiction bestsellers chart, after selling 1,079 copies in the week ending 14 August 2021. In the novel's first week it sold 1,241 hardback copies.

Critical reception of the novel was generally mixed. The review aggregator website Book Marks collected 5 reviews on the book, 2 of which were classified as "rave", 1 was classified as "positive", 1 as "mixed", and 1 as "pan". The Times Sarah Ditum called the novel a "thinly veiled wish fulfilment fantasy" that "is more slog than seduction" and rated it two out of five stars. The Daily Telegraph Hannah Betts described the novel as "underwhelming" and also rated it two out of five stars. The Guardian Alison Flood praised the work as "chaste good fun". The Independent Roisin O'Connor rated the novel three out of five stars. The Evening Standard Melanie McDonagh recalled the novel as "amiable tosh" and "a perfect example of the genre".

References

External links 

 Sarah Ferguson talks about new book, 'Her Heart for a Compass' from Good Morning America on YouTube

2021 British novels
British romance novels
HarperCollins books
William Morrow and Company books
Mills & Boon books